117th Brigade may refer to:

 117th Mixed Brigade (Spain)
 117th Brigade (United Kingdom)
 117th Infantry Brigade Royal Marines

See also

 117th Division (disambiguation)